Robert Ross Johnstone (April 7, 1926 – December 31, 2009) was a Canadian professional ice hockey player who played 42 games in the National Hockey League with the Toronto Maple Leafs during the 1943–44 and 1944–45 seasons. In 1945 his name was put on the Stanley Cup. He was born in Montreal, Quebec.

Career statistics

Regular season and playoffs

External links
 

1926 births
2009 deaths
Atlantic City Sea Gulls (EHL) players
Canadian ice hockey defencemen
Detroit Hettche players
Ice hockey people from Montreal
New Haven Ramblers players
Oshawa Generals players
Pittsburgh Hornets players
Providence Reds players
Springfield Indians players
Stanley Cup champions
Toronto Maple Leafs players
Toronto Marlboros players